Coiled-coil domain containing 17 is a protein that in humans is encoded by the CCDC17 gene.

References

Further reading 

Human proteins